Rhododendron aganniphum is a species of flowering plant in the heath family Ericaceae, native to Tibet and southwestern China (southern Qinghai, western Sichuan, southeastern Xizang, and northwestern Yunnan), where it grows at altitudes of . The flowers are rose-flushed white with maroon flecks, and often pink streaks.

References

External links
 
 The Plant List
 Flora of China
 Danish Soc. of ARS

aganniphum
Plants described in 1917
Taxa named by Isaac Bayley Balfour
Taxa named by Frank Kingdon-Ward